This is a list of contributing properties to the Union Avenue Historic Commercial District:

References

Historic districts in Colorado
Commercial buildings on the National Register of Historic Places in Colorado
National Register of Historic Places in Pueblo, Colorado